Smithson Valley High School is a public high school located in unincorporated Comal County, Texas, United States and classified as a 5A school by the UIL. It is part of the Comal Independent School District and is one of seven high schools in the district.

Smithson Valley High School is zoned for students who live primarily in the southwestern Comal County and northern Bexar County area, including Bulverde, Spring Branch, portions of Timberwood Park, and portions of Canyon Lake. In 2015, the school was rated "Met Standard" by the Texas Education Agency.

History
Smithson Valley High School was established in 1976 and was named after Benjamin Smithson, who was one of the first Texas Rangers., and an early settler in the area.

In 2007, some students were sent to the new Canyon Lake High School. Before the split, Smithson Valley's student enrollment reached as high as 2,500 students.

The enrollment for the 2010 school year was 2,062. 76% of students enrolled at that time were Caucasian, 20% Hispanic, and 3% African American. There was a student to teacher ratio of one to sixteen compared to the Texas average of one to twelve. 98% of enrolled students graduate in 2010.

Athletics
The Smithson Valley Rangers compete in a variety of sports. The school is part of District 27-6A.  In football, Smithson Valley has traveled to the University Interscholastic League State 5A Championship Game two times and the State 4A Championship Game once, resulting in three losses.  The current football coach, Larry Hill, has been head of all athletics since 1993.  Smithson Valley also offers club lacrosse, band, dance team, cheerleading, NJROTC, FFA, National Forensic League, and foreign language clubs along with several interest clubs.

State Titles
Softball 
2001(4A), 2009(5A), 2012(4A)
Academic Decathlon 
1991 (Small Schools Division)

Notable alumni 
 Eryk Anders — Cleveland Browns Practice Squad, professional Mixed Martial Artist, currently in the UFC's Middleweight Division
 Corey Clark — former 7th round pick San Diego Chargers
 Jason LaRue  — former MLB Catcher played with Cincinnati Reds (1999–2006), Kansas City Royals (2007) and the St. Louis Cardinals (2008–2010)
 Trevon Moehrig — defensive back at TCU, Jim Thorpe Award winner (2020), defensive back with the Las Vegas Raiders.
 Joe Pawelek — former Seattle Seahawks, Practice Squad Jacksonville Jaguars 
 Andrew Sendejo — current NFL defensive back
 Logan Cunningham - 2016 Olympic pole vaulter
Zac Reininger - Pitcher for the Detroit Tigers since 2017

References

External links
 
 Smithson Valley High School History
 Rangers Network
 Comal ISD

High schools in Comal County, Texas
Educational institutions established in 1976
Public high schools in Texas
1976 establishments in Texas